Dominic Scott (born 15 May 1979) is an Irish guitarist, and the founder of the English rock band Roundstone and a founding member of the alternative rock band Keane.

Keane
Scott attended Tonbridge School in Kent, where he met the other members of the band which would become Keane. In 1995, he asked his friend Tim Rice-Oxley to form a band to play covers from U2, Oasis and The Beatles. They invited Richard Hughes for the drums. The band was called "The Lotus Eaters" from 1995 to 1997.
In 1997, they changed their name to "Keane" and invited Rice-Oxley's friend Tom Chaplin to join as lead vocalist.

Scott left in July 2001, after the release of the single "Wolf at the Door", apparently due to musical differences with Rice-Oxley, the other songwriter of the band. His exit appears to have been amicable. Keane posted a message on their official page on 14 November 2001 stating:

"One sad piece of news for us is that in July our guitarist Dom decided to leave the band and return to his studies at LSE. We wish him all the best with that. Dom's departure does give us scope to develop our sound in new directions, and the new recordings reflect the love of more electronic and ambient music that inspired us to start writing songs in the first place. The sound is still unmistakably Keane – epic and dreamlike – but we're confident we've captured a new level of energy and atmosphere on tape.".

Rice-Oxley commented in Mexico: "Dom is a great fan of U2 so maybe we'll meet in New York" (since Keane often opened for U2 in 2005.)

Roundstone
After a break from music, during which he completed an MSc in Economics from the London School of Economics, Scott formed a band with his Goodenough College friends Alistair Watson, Andrew Morgan and Benjamin Salmon. The band was initially called "Babygrand" but was changed to "Roundstone" in 2007.

References

1979 births
Living people
Irish songwriters
Irish guitarists
Irish male guitarists
Keane (band) members
Musicians from County Dublin